is the 16th single by Japanese music trio Candies. Written by Makoto Kitajō and Takurō Yoshida, the single was released on September 21, 1977. The B-side, "Futari no Love Song", is a Japanese-language cover of The Carpenters' song "All You Get from Love Is a Love Song".

The song peaked at No. 7 on Oricon's singles chart and sold over 281,000 copies.

Track listing 
All music is arranged by Kōji Makaino.

Chart positions

Cover versions
 Takurō Yoshida self-covered the song in 1977, adding the line: "Sayonara Candies".
 Theresa Cheung did a Cantonese cover version in 1979, under the title of "Far Away".(Jyutping: Qíng yáoyuǎn)

References

External links 
 

1977 singles
1977 songs
Japanese-language songs
Candies (group) songs
Sony Music Entertainment Japan singles